Niphona subgrisea is a species of beetle in the family Cerambycidae. It was described by Stephan von Breuning in 1973. It is known from Pakistan.

References

subgrisea
Beetles described in 1973